The 2018–19 ICC T20 World Cup East Asia-Pacific Qualifier was the tournament played in Fiji and Philippines as part of qualification process for the 2021 ICC T20 World Cup.

Twelve regional qualifiers were held by the International Cricket Council (ICC), with 62 teams competing during 2018 in five regions – Africa (3 groups), Americas (2), Asia (2), East Asia Pacific (2) and Europe (3). The top 25 sides from these progressed to five Regional Finals in 2019, with seven teams then going on to compete in the 2019 ICC T20 World Cup Qualifier, along with the six lowest ranked sides from the ICC T20I Championship. In April 2018, the International Cricket Council (ICC) granted full international status to Twenty20 men's matches played between member sides from 1 January 2019 onwards. Therefore, all the matches in the Regional Finals were played as Twenty20 Internationals (T20Is).

The top two teams in Group A, and the top team of Group B of the East Asia-Pacific Qualifier, progressed to the Regional Finals. Papua New Guinea won Group A, with Vanuatu finishing in second place to progress to the Finals. Group B was won by the Philippines. It was also the first ICC tournament to be held in the Philippines.

The Regional Finals were held in Papua New Guinea in March 2019. Papua New Guinea progressed to the T20 World Cup Qualifier after winning the Regional Finals.

Teams

Group A

Group A was held in Fiji from 25 to 29 August 2018, with the top two teams progressing to the Regional Final.

Points table

(H) Host, (Q) Qualified to regional finals
</noinclude>

Fixtures

Group B

Group B was held at Friendship Oval at Emilio Aguinaldo College in Dasmariñas, Philippines from 1 to 7 December 2018. The top team progressed to the Regional Finals.

Points table

(H) Host, (Q) Qualified to regional finals

Fixtures

Regional Finals
The Regional Finals were held in Papua New Guinea from 22 to 24 March 2019. Following the effects of Cyclone Trevor, fixtures on the opening two days could not be played due to a waterlogged pitch, so the schedule was rearranged. On the first day of fixtures, Papua New Guinea won their two matches, both by large margins. Before the last day of matches, Papua New Guinea and Vanuatu were both in contention to win the group, with the Philippines being eliminated. On the last day of fixtures, Papua New Guinea won the group to advance to the 2019 ICC T20 World Cup Qualifier, with Vanuatu being eliminated after losing against the Philippines. Nalin Nipiko of Vanuatu was named the Player of the Tournament.

Points table

Fixtures

Notes

References

External links
 East Asia-Pacific group at the International Cricket Council

ICC Men's T20 World Cup Qualifier
International cricket competitions in 2018–19
2021 ICC Men's T20 World Cup